Hipp is a surname. Notable people with the surname include:

Bryan Hipp (1968–2006), extreme metal guitarist
Christopher Hipp (1961–2009), inventor of the blade server
D. Richard Hipp (born 1961), American free software programmer
Hanna Hipp, Polish lyric mezzo-soprano
James William Hipp (born 1934), American music educator
Joe Hipp (born 1962), U.S. professional boxer
John Hipp, American criminologist
Josef Hipp (1927–1959), German Olympic athlete
Jutta Hipp (1925–2003), German-born jazz pianist and painter
I. M. Hipp (Isiah Moses Hipp; born 1956), American football running back
Matthäus Hipp (1813–1893), German clock maker, inventor of Hipp-Toggle
Michal Hipp (born 13 1963), Slovak footballer and manager
Otto Hipp (1885–1952), mayor of Regensburg
Paul Hipp (born 1963), American actor, singer, songwriter and filmmaker
Van Hipp Jr. (born 1960), chairman of the South Carolina Republican Party
John Wesley Hipp (1834-1862) Infantryman,9th Alabama Infantry Co. D- Lauderdale Rifles

See also
Health Insurance Premium Payment Program (HIPP)